Ávila or Avila (variants include de Ávila, de Avila, D'Ávila or D'Avila, Dávila, Davila or Abila) is a Spanish or Galician surname, originally de Ávila (who comes from a city named Ávila, most likely Ávila, Spain).

Notable people with the surname include:

(Alphabetical by surname)
 
Alex Avila (born 1987), American baseball player
Amelio Robles Ávila (1889–1984), Mexican revolutionary
Andrea Ávila (born 1970), Argentine long and triple jumper
Artur Avila (born 1979), Brazilian mathematician
Bobby Ávila (1924–2004), American baseball player
Bonifacio Ávila (born 1950), Colombian boxer
Charles F. Avila (1906–2000), American electrical engineer
Eva Avila (born 1987), Canadian singer
Gustavo Ávila (born 1938), Venezuelan jockey
Héctor Ávila (born 1972), Dominican Republic boxer
John Avila, American bassist from Oingo Boingo
Juan Tomás Ávila Laurel (born 1966), Equatoguinean writer
Lixion Avila (born 1950), American weather forecaster
Pedro Ávila (born 1997), Venezuelan baseball player
Ricardo Ávila (born 1997), Panamanian footballer
Rodrigo Ávila (born 1964), Salvadoran politician
Saint Teresa of Ávila (1515–1582), Roman Catholic saint, 16th Century mystic
Sandra Ávila Beltrán (born 16 October 1960), one of the first female drug traffickers to reach the level of "Boss" in the Mexican cartels and one of the inspirations for the novel Queen of the South and its spinoff television series
Sergio Avila (born 1985), former Mexican footballer
Steve Avila (born 1999), American football player
Yiye Ávila (1925–2013), Puerto Rican evangelist

Adolfo Dávila (born 1965), Mexican filmmaker
Alberto Dávila (born c. 1960), Mexican-American boxer
Alexandru Davila (1862–1929),  Romanian dramatist, diplomat, public administrator, and memoirist, son of Carol Davila
Carol Davila (1828–1884), Romanian physician, physicist and general of French origin 
Carlos Dávila (born 1887),  Chilean statesman
Carlos Dávila (chess player) (born 1971), Nicaraguan chess master
Carlos Lage Dávila (born 1951), Cuban politician
Desiree Davila, (b. 1983) American Olympic marathoner
Enrico Caterino Davila (born 1576),  Italian historian
Fidel Dávila Arrondo (born 1878), Spanish army officer
Guillermo Dávila (born 1955), Venezuelan actor and singer
Joaquín Dávila, managing director of the Carlyle Group
José Antonio Dávila (born 1898),  Puerto Rican poet
Karen Davila (born 1970), Filipina newscaster and broadcast journalist
Luis Davila (disambiguation), several people
Marisa Davila (born 1997), American actress
Miguel R. Dávila (1856–1927), President of Honduras
Mónica Farro Dávila (born 1976), Uruguayan theatrical supervedette, actress and dancer
Nick Davila (born 1985), American football player
Nicolás Gómez Dávila (1913–1994),  Colombian philosopher
Pedrarias Dávila (Pedro Arias de Ávila) (born 1440), colonial administrator
Pedro Ortiz Dávila ("Davilita") (born 1912), Puerto Rican singer
Robert R. Davila (born 1932), American advocate for the deaf, Assistant Secretary of Education, and President of Gallaudet University
Rudolph B. Davila (1916–2002), American Medal of Honor Recipient, World War II
Ulises Dávila (born 1991), Mexican association football player
Virgilio Dávila (1869–1943),  Puerto Rican poet, educator, politician and businessman

Portuguese-language surnames
Spanish-language surnames